The Rare Book Hub (formerly known as the  Americana Exchange) is a website for the buying, selling and collecting of rare and antiquarian books. It was founded in 2002 in San Francisco by rare book collector Bruce McKinney with the aim of offering hard to find information about book collecting to the public. From a start of providing a subscription database of bibliographic records, the company now offers many related services, mostly at no charge. The company at first specialized in the Americana book field, but quickly expanded to all types of antiquarian and rare books, ephemera, manuscripts, prints, photographs, and other works on paper.

References

External links
 
 Rare Book Monthly
 Book Auction Calendar and Search

American review websites
Book selling websites
Bookstores of the United States
Companies based in San Francisco
Retail companies established in 2002

Book review websites
2002 establishments in California
Magazines established in 2002